William John Bartlett (13 April 1878 – 6 August 1939) was an English professional footballer, who played for Sheffield Wednesday, Huddersfield Town and Linfield.

Bartlett stayed in Belfast after his football career ended, where he worked as a member of the Belfast Corporation Surveyor's Department. After a short illness, he died at Royal Victoria Hospital in Belfast, age 61. He was survived by his wife, Margaret Bartlett. His funeral was held at Belfast City Cemetery, where a large attendance came to pay their respects, including representatives of Linfield F.C., the Irish Football Association, Irish Football League, and the Belfast Corporation.

References

1878 births
1939 deaths
Footballers from Newcastle upon Tyne
Association football defenders
English footballers
English Football League players
Sheffield Wednesday F.C. players
Huddersfield Town A.F.C. players
English surveyors
FA Cup Final players